Zabrus seriatus is a species of ground beetle in the Pelor subgenus that can be found in Turkey and Erzerum, Armenia.

References

Beetles described in 1915
Beetles of Asia